

H01A Anterior pituitary lobe hormones and analogues

H01AA Adrenocorticotropic hormone
H01AA01 Corticotropin
H01AA02 Tetracosactide

H01AB Thyrotropin
H01AB01 Thyrotropin alfa

H01AC Somatropin and somatropin agonists
H01AC01 Somatropin
H01AC02 Somatrem
H01AC03 Mecasermin
H01AC04 Sermorelin
H01AC05 Mecasermin rinfabate
H01AC06 Tesamorelin
H01AC07 Somapacitan
H01AC08 Somatrogon
H01AC09 Lonapegsomatropin

H01AX Other anterior pituitary lobe hormones and analogues
H01AX01 Pegvisomant
QH01AX90 Capromorelin

H01B Posterior pituitary lobe hormones

H01BA Vasopressin and analogues
H01BA01 Vasopressin (argipressin)
H01BA02 Desmopressin
H01BA03 Lypressin
H01BA04 Terlipressin
H01BA05 Ornipressin

H01BB Oxytocin and analogues
H01BB01 Demoxytocin
H01BB02 Oxytocin
H01BB03 Carbetocin

H01C Hypothalamic hormones

H01CA Gonadotropin-releasing hormones
H01CA01 Gonadorelin
H01CA02 Nafarelin
QH01CA90 Buserelin
QH01CA91 Fertirelin
QH01CA92 Lecirelin
QH01CA93 Deslorelin
QH01CA94 Azagly-nafarelin
QH01CA95 Peforelin
QH01CA96 Salmon gonadotropin releasing hormone analogue
QH01CA97 Triptorelin
QH01CA98 Alarelin

H01CB Somatostatin and analogues
H01CB01 Somatostatin
H01CB02 Octreotide
H01CB03 Lanreotide
H01CB04 Vapreotide
H01CB05 Pasireotide

H01CC Anti-gonadotropin-releasing hormones
H01CC01 Ganirelix
H01CC02 Cetrorelix
H01CC03 Elagolix
H01CC04 Linzagolix
H01CC53 Elagolix, estradiol and norethisterone
H01CC54 Relugolix, estradiol and norethisterone

References

H01